The 1971 Wandsworth Council election took place on 13 May 1971 to elect members of Wandsworth London Borough Council in London, England. The whole council was up for election and the Labour party gained overall control of the council.

Background

Election result

Ward results

References

1971
1971 London Borough council elections